The 1976–77 Egyptian Premier League, was the 20th season of the Egyptian Premier League, the top Egyptian professional league for association football clubs, since its establishment in 1948. The season started on 3 September 1976 and concluded on 6 June 1977.
Al Ahly managed to win the league for the 14th time in the club's history.

League table

 (C)= Champion, (R)= Relegated, Pld = Matches played; W = Matches won; D = Matches drawn; L = Matches lost; F = Goals for; A = Goals against; ± = Goal difference; Pts = Points.

Top goalscorers

Teams location

References

External links 
 All Egyptian Competitions Info

5
1976–77 in African association football leagues
1976–77 in Egyptian football